Kyai Gedhe Pamanahan was the first ruler of the Sultanate of Mataram. He is also referred to as Kyai Gedhe Mataram.

He was the descendant of Ki Ageng Sela (Sela is a village near present-day Demak). Pamanahan became the war advisor of the king of Pajang, Sultan Hadiwijaya. After Hadiwijaya won a battle against Aria Panangsang with his advice, he gave Pamanahan the land to the south, near modern Surakarta, which became the Sultanate of Mataram, with the right of autonomous government.

Sultans of Mataram
Indonesian monarchs
16th-century monarchs in Asia
16th-century Indonesian people